Glenville-Emmons Public Schools, Independent School District 2886, is a comprehensive community public school district headquartered in Glenville, Minnesota, United States.

The district serves Glenville and Emmons areas in Freeborn County.

The district was established in 1991 by the consolidation of two previously separate school districts in Glenville and Emmons.

The current supperendent is Brian Shanks, who is also the supperendent for neighbouring school district, Alden-Conger. Glenville-Emmons' football, cheerleading, softball, and baseball teams are combined with that district. Students can also join Albert Lea High School's sports, mock trial, and robotics team.

Schools
Schools in the district (with 2012–13 enrollment data) are:

Elementary School
Glenville-Emmons Elementary
in Glenville, Minnesota.
 Grades PK-6.
 100+ students.
 Jeff Tietje, principal

High School
Glenville-Emmons High School
 Grades 7–12.
 100+ students.
 Jeff Tietje, principal

References

External links
 Glenville-Emmons Public Schools
School districts in Minnesota
Education in Freeborn County, Minnesota
School districts established in 1991